KTWS (98.3 FM, "The Twins") is a commercial radio station broadcasting a rock music format to Bend in the U.S. state of Oregon. It has filed an application for a U.S. Federal Communications Commission construction permit to move to 98.5 MHz and increase ERP to 50,000 watts.

References

External links
KTWS official website

FCC application

TWS
Classic rock radio stations in the United States
Radio stations established in 1990
1990 establishments in Oregon